Methion is a monotypic genus of skipper butterflies in the family Hesperiidae. It has one species, Methion melas.

References
Natural History Museum Lepidoptera genus database

Hesperiinae
Monotypic butterfly genera
Hesperiidae genera